ATN News is a Bangladeshi Bengali-language satellite and cable news-oriented television channel. Beginning operations on 7 June 2010, it is the first contemporary news channel in Bangladesh. It is a sister television channel to ATN Bangla. Its slogan is “বাংলার ২৪ ঘণ্টা”, meaning 24 hours of Bengal. The channel is operating using Bangladesh's first satellite Bangabandhu-1 operated by Bangladesh Communication Satellite Company Limited.

History
ATN News broadcast its first test transmission on 1 May 2010, and officially went on air on 7 June 2010. World class television journalist and media personality Mishuk Munier joined ATN News as CEO and chief editor in November 2010. He worked with the TV station until his death on 13 August 2011. Noted Bangladeshi journalist Abed Khan took over the role of CEO and chief editor in 2011; he remained in that post until his resignation on 20 April 2013. Currently, Dr. Mahfuzur Rahman is the chairman of ATN News, while Mir Md. Motaher Hasan serves as CEO of ATN News and Munni Saha acts as CEE. ATN News was one of the nine Bangladeshi television channels to sign an agreement with Bdnews24.com to subscribe to a video-based news agency run by children called Prism in May 2016. In December 2019, ATN News, along with three other Bangladeshi television channels, signed an agreement with UNICEF to air programming regarding children's issues.

Programming
 Amader Kotha (আমাদের কথা), a show reflecting the view, opinion and reaction of general people on a particular topic. Amader Kotha runs for around 5–10 minutes.
 Box Office, a weekly entertainment show encompassing new and upcoming releases, gossip, top music charts and other entertainment stories. The 20-minute-long show also discusses world music and other sources of entertainment.
 Ei Banglai (এই বাংলায়), a 20-minute video journal that examines life throughout the country. Hosted by Munni Saha.
 Ekdin Protidin (একদিন প্রতিদিন), an interview show covering the daily life of a personality. Ekdin Protidin runs for around 20 minutes.
 News Hour Xtra, a talk show on the most-discussed issue of the day. News Hour Xtra runs for around 60 minutes.
 Sports Insight, a daily sports bulletin. Sports Insight runs for roughly 20 minutes.
 Young Nite, a program reflecting the views, opinions and lifestyles of the young generation. Young Nite runs for 40 minutes.

See also 
 Telecom System in Bangladesh
 List of television stations in Bangladesh
 List of Bangladeshi TV and radio Channels

References

External links 

 

2010 establishments in Bangladesh
Mass media in Dhaka
Television channels and stations established in 2010
Television channels in Bangladesh
24-hour television news channels in Bangladesh